The 2017 Philadelphia Phillies season was the 135th season in the history of the franchise, and its 14th season at Citizens Bank Park. The Phillies opened the season against the Cincinnati Reds at the Great American Ball Park on April 3 and finished the season on October 1 against the New York Mets in Philadelphia. They were coached by Pete Mackanin in his third year as manager of the Phillies. On September 17, 2017, the Phillies were mathematically eliminated from postseason contention. They finished the season 66–96 to finish in last place in their division for the third time in four seasons, failing to make the playoffs for the sixth consecutive year.

Manager Pete Mackanin was reassigned to a front office position following the season.

Offseason

The Phillies made several moves over the offseason to bolster the bullpen and add a veteran presence to the lineup. On November 4, the Phillies acquired relief pitcher Pat Neshek from the Houston Astros for a player to be named later. A few days later, Darin Ruf and Darnell Sweeney were traded to the Los Angeles Dodgers for left fielder Howie Kendrick. Andrés Blanco signed a one-year, $3 million contract to return to the Phillies on December 14. On January 19, the Phillies signed free agent outfielder Michael Saunders to a one-year deal.

Matt Stairs was hired as the team's hitting coach in the offseason. He replaced Steve Henderson, who had served in the role since 2013.

Regular season

April
For the second consecutive season, the Phillies faced the Cincinnati Reds on the road to start the season. The Phillies won the game 4–3, behind a leadoff home run by César Hernández; the first Opening Day leadoff home run for the Phillies since 1938.

The Phillies faced the Washington Nationals in their home opener on April 7. The Nationals would win the game 7–6. The next night, the Phillies scored 12 runs in the first inning off of Jeremy Guthrie and Enny Romero en route to a 17–3 victory over Washington. During the same homestand, Clay Buchholz left a game with a torn flexor tendon in his pitching arm. He was placed on the disabled list, and the Phillies called up Zach Eflin to take his place in the rotation.

August
The Phillies turned a triple play on August 27 in the 5th inning against the reigning World Series champion Chicago Cubs. The Phillies would go on to win the game 6–3.

Season standings

National League East

National League Wild Card

Record vs. opponents

Game log

|- style="background:#bfb;"
| 1 || April 3 || @ Reds || 4–3 ||  || Scott Feldman (0–1) || Jeanmar Gómez (1) || 43,804 || 1–0 || W1
|- style="background:#fbb"
| 2 || April 5 || @ Reds || 0–2 || Brandon Finnegan (1–0) || Jerad Eickhoff (0–1) || Raisel Iglesias (1) || 19,944 || 1–1 || L1
|- style="background:#fbb"
| 3 || April 6 || @ Reds || 4–7 || Cody Reed (1–0) || Adam Morgan (0–1) || Drew Storen (1) || 10,586 || 1–2 || L2
|- style="background:#fbb"
| 4 || April 7 || Nationals || 6–7 || Max Scherzer (1–0) || Vince Velasquez (0–1) || Blake Treinen (3) || 45,121 || 1–3 || L3
|- style="background:#bfb"
| 5 || April 8 || Nationals || 17–3 || Aaron Nola (1–0) || Jeremy Guthrie (0–1) || — || 37,241 || 2–3 || W1
|- style="background:#bfb"
| 6 || April 9 || Nationals || 4–3 || Jeanmar Gómez (1–0) || Koda Glover (0–1) || — || 36,917 || 3–3 || W2
|- style="background:#fbb"
| 7 || April 10 || Mets || 3–4 || Jerry Blevins (1–0) || Edubray Ramos (0–1) || Addison Reed (2) || 33,359 || 3–4 || L1
|- style="background:#fbb"
| 8 || April 11 || Mets || 4–14 || Matt Harvey (2–0) || Clay Buchholz (0–1) || — || 28,659 || 3–5 || L2
|- style="background:#fbb"
| 9 || April 12 || Mets || 4–5 || Zack Wheeler (1–1) || Vince Velasquez (0–2) || Addison Reed (3) || 28,272 || 3–6 || L3
|- style="background:#fbb"
| 10 || April 14 || @ Nationals || 2–3 (10) || Shawn Kelley (1–0) || Jeanmar Gómez (1–1) || — || 38,664 || 3–7 || L4
|- style="background:#bfb"
| 11 || April 15 || @ Nationals || 4–2 || Jeremy Hellickson (2–0) || Joe Blanton (0–2) || Joaquín Benoit (1) || 35,626 || 4–7 || W1
|- style="background:#fbb"
| 12 || April 16 || @ Nationals || 4–6 || Shawn Kelley (2–0) || Joaquín Benoit (0–1) || — || 29,774 || 4–8 || L1
|- style="background:#bfb"
| 13 || April 18 || @ Mets || 6–2 (10) || Luis García (1–0) || Rafael Montero (0–2) || — || 23,536 || 5–8 || W1
|- style="background:#fbb"
| 14 || April 19 || @ Mets || 4–5 || Hansel Robles (3–0) || Edubray Ramos (0–2) || Addison Reed (4) || 22,243 || 5–9 || L1
|- style="background:#bfb"
| 15 || April 20 || @ Mets || 6–4 || Aaron Nola (2–0) ||  || Héctor Neris (1) || 24,656 || 6–9 || W1
|- style="background:#bfb"
| 16 || April 21 || Braves || 4–3 || Jeremy Hellickson (3–0) || Bartolo Colón (1–2) || Héctor Neris (2) || 24,189 || 7–9 || W2
|- style="background:#bfb"
| 17 || April 22 || Braves || 4–3 (10) || Jeanmar Gómez (2–1) || Jim Johnson (2–1) || — || 31,334 || 8–9 || W3
|- style="background:#bfb"
| 18 || April 23 || Braves || 5–2 || Joely Rodríguez (1–0) || Arodys Vizcaíno (1–1) || — || 28,632 || 9–9 || W4
|- style="background:#bbb"
| – || April 25 || Marlins || colspan=7 | Postponed (rain); Makeup: August 22 as a straight doubleheader
|- style="background:#bfb"
| 19 || April 26 || Marlins || 7–4 || Vince Velasquez (1–2) || Wei-Yin Chen (2–1) || — || 26,191 || 10–9 || W5
|- style="background:#bfb"
| 20 || April 27 || Marlins || 3–2 || Jeremy Hellickson (4–0) || Edinson Vólquez (0–3) || Héctor Neris (3) || 22,180 || 11–9 || W6
|- style="background:#fbb"
| 21 || April 28 || @ Dodgers || 3–5 || Kenta Maeda (2–2) || Jerad Eickhoff (0–2) || Kenley Jansen (6) || 46,729 || 11–10 || L1
|- style="background:#fbb"
| 22 || April 29 || @ Dodgers || 5–6 || Grant Dayton (1–0) || Héctor Neris (0–1) || — || 53,110 || 11–11 || L2
|- style="background:#fbb"
| 23 || April 30 || @ Dodgers || 3–5 || Hyun-jin Ryu (1–4) || Nick Pivetta (0–1) || Kenley Jansen (7) || 48,961 || 11–12 || L3
|-

|- style="background:#bfb"
| 24 || May 1 || @ Cubs || 10–2 || Vince Velasquez (2–2) || Brett Anderson (2–1) || — || 38,567 || 12–12 || W1
|- style="background:#fbb"
| 25 || May 2 || @ Cubs || 3–8 || Jon Lester (1–1) ||  || — || 38,660 || 12–13 || L1
|- style="background:#fbb"
| 26 || May 3 || @ Cubs || 4–5 || Jake Arrieta (4–1) || Jerad Eickhoff (0–3) || Wade Davis (7) || 39,335 || 12–14 || L2
|- style="background:#fbb"
| 27 || May 4 || @ Cubs || 4–5 (13) || Koji Uehara (1–2) || Joely Rodríguez (1–1) || — || 36,394 || 12–15 || L3
|- style="background:#fbb"
| 28 || May 5 || Nationals || 2–4 ||  || Nick Pivetta (0–2) || Matt Albers (1) || 20,237 || 12–16 || L4
|- style="background:#fbb"
| 29 || May 6 || Nationals || 2–6 || A. J. Cole (1–0) || Vince Velasquez (2–3) || — || 21,298 || 12–17 || L5
|- style="background:#bfb"
| 30 || May 7 || Nationals || 6–5 (10) || Héctor Neris (1–1) || Blake Treinen (0–1) || — || 30,464 || 13–17 || W1
|- style="background:#fbb"
| 31 || May 9 || Mariners || 9–10 || Nick Vincent (1–0) || Héctor Neris (1–2) || Edwin Díaz (7) || 31,715 || 13–18 || L1
|- style="background:#fbb"
| 32 || May 10 || Mariners || 6–11 || Tony Zych (2–0) || Joaquín Benoit (0–2) || — || 26,697 || 13–19 || L2
|- style="background:#bbb"
| – || May 12 || @ Nationals || colspan=7 | Postponed (rain); Makeup: May 14 as a split doubleheader
|- style="background:#fbb"
| 33 || May 13 || @ Nationals || 4–6 || Shawn Kelley (3–0) || Edubray Ramos (0–3) || — || 31,473 || 13–20 || L3
|- style="background:#bfb"
| 34 || May 14 (1)|| @ Nationals || 4–3 || Joaquín Benoit (1–2) || Shawn Kelley (3–1) || Héctor Neris (4) || 31,738 || 14–20 || W1
|- style="background:#fbb"
| 35 || May 14 (2)|| @ Nationals || 5–6 || Jacob Turner (2–1) || Pat Neshek (0–1) || Matt Albers (2) || 30,137 || 14–21 || L1
|- style="background:#fbb"
| 36 || May 16 || @ Rangers || 1–5 || Yu Darvish (4–2) || Jerad Eickhoff (0–4) || — || 23,110 || 14–22 || L2
|- style="background:#fbb"
| 37 || May 17 || @ Rangers || 3–9 || Andrew Cashner (1–3) || Zach Eflin (0–1) || — || 28,703 || 14–23 || L3
|- style="background:#fbb"
| 38 || May 18 || @ Rangers || 4–8 || Martín Pérez (2–5) || Joely Rodríguez (1–2) || — || 35,007 || 14–24 || L4
|- style="background:#bfb"
| 39 || May 19 || @ Pirates || 7–2 || Jeremy Hellickson (5–1) || Trevor Williams (2–3) || — || 25,795 || 15–24 || W1
|- style="background:#fbb"
| 40 || May 20 || @ Pirates || 3–6 || Iván Nova (4–3) || Vince Velasquez (2–4) || Tony Watson (9) || 32,572 || 15–25 || L1
|- style="background:#fbb"
| 41 || May 21 || @ Pirates || 0–1 || Wade LeBlanc (3–0) || Aaron Nola (2–1) || Tony Watson (10) || 24,445 || 15–26 || L2
|- style="background:#fbb"
| 42 || May 22 || Rockies || 1–8 || Jeff Hoffman (2–0) || Jerad Eickhoff (0–5) || — || 21,251 || 15–27 || L3
|- style="background:#fbb"
| 43 || May 23 || Rockies || 2–8 || Germán Márquez (3–2) || Zach Eflin (0–2) || — || 17,109 || 15–28 || L4
|- style="background:#fbb"
| 44 || May 24 || Rockies || 2–7 || Tyler Chatwood (4–6) || Jeremy Hellickson (5–2) || — || 19,160 || 15–29 || L5
|- style="background:#bfb"
| 45 || May 25 || Rockies || 4–3 (11) || Jeanmar Gómez (3–1) || Scott Oberg (0–1) || — || 18,143 || 16–29 || W1
|- style="background:#fbb"
| 46 || May 26 || Reds || 2–5 || Tim Adleman (3–2) || Aaron Nola (2–2) || Raisel Iglesias (9) || 21,388 || 16–30 || L1
|- style="background:#bfb"
| 47 || May 27 || Reds || 4–3 || Héctor Neris (2–2) || Michael Lorenzen (3–1) || — || 30,100 || 17–30 || W1
|- style="background:#fbb"
| 48 || May 28 || Reds || 4–8 || Scott Feldman (4–4) || Zach Eflin (0–3) || — || 25,413 || 17–31 || L1
|- style="background:#fbb"
| 49 || May 29 || @ Marlins || 1–4 || Edinson Vólquez (1–7) || Jeremy Hellickson (5–3) || A. J. Ramos (6) || 17,032 || 17–32 || L2
|- style="background:#fbb"
| 50 || May 30 || @ Marlins || 2–7 || Dustin McGowan (2–0) || Vince Velasquez (2–5) || — || 16,241 || 17–33 || L3
|- style="background:#fbb"
| 51 || May 31 || @ Marlins || 2–10 || Dan Straily (4–3) || Aaron Nola (2–3) || — || 15,197 || 17–34 || L4
|-

|- style="background:#fbb"
| 52 || June 2 || Giants || 0–10 || Ty Blach (4–2) || Jerad Eickhoff (0–6) || — || 22,491 || 17–35 || L5
|- style="background:#bfb"
| 53 || June 3 || Giants || 5–3 || Ben Lively (1–0) || Johnny Cueto (5–5) || Jeanmar Gómez (2) || 32,413 || 18–35 || W1
|- style="background:#bfb"
| 54 || June 4 || Giants || 9–7 || Pat Neshek (1–1) || Derek Law (3–1) || Héctor Neris (5) || 25,063 || 19–35 || W2
|- style="background:#bfb"
| 55 || June 5 || @ Braves || 11–4 || Nick Pivetta (1–2) || Bartolo Colón (2–7) || — || 20,942 || 20–35 || W3
|- style="background:#bfb"
| 56 || June 6 || @ Braves || 3–1 || Aaron Nola (3–3) || Jaime García (2–4) || Pat Neshek (1) || 23,489 || 21–35 || W4
|- style="background:#fbb"
| 57 || June 7 || @ Braves || 1–14 || Mike Foltynewicz (4–5) || Jerad Eickhoff (0–7) || — || 24,185 || 21–36 || L1
|- style="background:#fbb"
| 58 || June 8 || @ Braves || 1–3 || R. A. Dickey (4–4) || Ben Lively (1–1) || Jim Johnson (12) || 25,095 || 21–37 || L2
|- style="background:#fbb"
| 59 || June 9 || @ Cardinals || 2–3 || Michael Wacha (3–3) ||  || Seung-hwan Oh (14) || 42,971 || 21–38 || L3
|- style="background:#fbb"
| 60 || June 10 || @ Cardinals || 0–7 || Carlos Martínez (5–5) || Nick Pivetta (1–3) || — || 43,911 || 21–39 || L4
|- style="background:#fbb"
| 61 || June 11 || @ Cardinals || 5–6 || Adam Wainwright (7–4) || Aaron Nola (3–4) || Seung-hwan Oh (15) || 47,325 || 21–40 || L5
|- style="background:#fbb"
| 62 || June 12 || @ Red Sox || 5–6 (11) || Matt Barnes (5–2) || Casey Fien (0–1) || — || 36,757 || 21–41 || L6
|- style="background:#fbb"
| 63 || June 13 || @ Red Sox || 3–4 (12) || Fernando Abad (2–0) || Luis García (1–1) || — || 37,141 || 21–42 || L7
|- style="background:#fbb"
| 64 || June 14 || Red Sox || 3–7 || Héctor Velázquez (1–1) || Jeremy Hellickson (5–5) || — || 28,263 || 21–43 || L8
|- style="background:#bfb"
| 65 || June 15 || Red Sox || 1–0 || Pat Neshek (2–1) || Chris Sale (8–3) || Héctor Neris (6) || 30,729 || 22–43 || W1
|- style="background:#fbb"
| 66 || June 16 || Diamondbacks || 4–5 || Patrick Corbin (6–6) || Aaron Nola (3–5) || Fernando Rodney (19) || 18,140 || 22–44 || L1
|- style="background:#fbb"
| 67 || June 17 || Diamondbacks || 1–5 || Jorge de la Rosa (3–1) || Edubray Ramos (0–4) || — || 21,108 || 22–45 || L2
|- style="background:#fbb"
| 68 || June 18 || Diamondbacks || 4–5 (12) || Archie Bradley (3–1) || Jeanmar Gómez (3–2) || Fernando Rodney (20) || 31,131 || 22–46 || L3
|- style="background:#fbb"
| 69 || June 20 || Cardinals || 1–8 (11) || Kevin Siegrist (1–1) || Edubray Ramos (0–5) || — || 22,070 || 22–47 || L4
|- style="background:#fbb"
| 70 || June 21 || Cardinals || 6–7 (10) || Brett Cecil (1–2) || Edubray Ramos (0–6) || Seung-hwan Oh (16) || 25,037 || 22–48 || L5
|- style="background:#bfb"
| 71 || June 22 || Cardinals || 5–1 || Aaron Nola (4–5) || Carlos Martínez (6–6) || — || 23,623 || 23–48 || W1
|- style="background:#bfb"
| 72 || June 23 || @ Diamondbacks || 6–1 || Mark Leiter (1–0) || Patrick Corbin (6–7) || — || 31,648 || 24–48 || W2
|- style="background:#fbb"
| 73 || June 24 || @ Diamondbacks || 2–9 || Robbie Ray (8–3) || Ben Lively (1–2) || — || 40,557 || 24–49 || L1
|- style="background:#fbb"
| 74 || June 25 || @ Diamondbacks || 1–2 (11) || T. J. McFarland (4–1) || Edubray Ramos (0–7) || — || 28,179 || 24–50 || L2
|- style="background:#fbb"
| 75 || June 26 || @ Diamondbacks || 1–6 || Zack Greinke (9–4) || Nick Pivetta (1–4) || — || 20,765 || 24–51 || L3
|- style="background:#bfb"
| 76 || June 27 || @ Mariners || 8–2 || Aaron Nola (5–5) || James Paxton (5–3) || — || 22,648 || 25–51 || W1
|- style="background:#bfb"
| 77 || June 28 || @ Mariners || 5–4 || Ricardo Pinto (1–0) || Edwin Díaz (2–3) || Héctor Neris (7) || 29,505 || 26–51 || W2
|- style="background:#fbb"
| 78 || June 30 || @ Mets || 1–2 || Jacob deGrom (8–3) || Ben Lively (1–3) || Addison Reed (13) || 37,134 || 26–52 || L1
|-

|- style="background:#fbb"
| 79 || July 1 || @ Mets || 6–7 || Fernando Salas (1–2) || Pat Neshek (2–2) || Addison Reed (14) || 33,080 || 26–53 || L2
|- style="background:#bfb"
| 80 || July 2 || @ Mets || 7–1 || Nick Pivetta (2–4) || Rafael Montero (1–5) || — || 30,343 || 27–53 || W1
|- style="background:#bfb"
| 81 || July 3 || Pirates || 4–0 || Aaron Nola (6–5) || Iván Nova (8–6) || — || 26,498 || 28–53 || W2
|- style="background:#fbb"
| 82 || July 4 || Pirates || 0–3 || Jameson Taillon (5–1) || Mark Leiter (1–1) || Felipe Rivero (4) || 24,087 || 28–54 || L1
|- style="background:#fbb"
| 83 || July 5 || Pirates || 2–5 || Gerrit Cole (7–7) || Ben Lively (1–4) || Felipe Rivero (5) || 19,099 || 28–55 || L2
|- style="background:#fbb"
| 84 || July 6 || Pirates || 3–6 || Chad Kuhl (3–6) || Joaquín Benoit (1–3) || Juan Nicasio (1) || 33,059 || 28–56 || L3
|- style="background:#fbb"
| 85 || July 7 || Padres || 3–4 || Brad Hand (2–4) || Héctor Neris (2–3) || Brandon Maurer (18) || 38,533 || 28–57 || L4
|- style="background:#fbb"
| 86 || July 8 || Padres || 1–2 || Jhoulys Chacín (8–7) || Aaron Nola (6–6) || Brandon Maurer (19) || 33,216 || 28–58 || L5
|- style="background:#bfb"
| 87 || July 9 || Padres || 7–1 || Jerad Eickhoff (1–7) || Trevor Cahill (3–3) || — || 21,184 || 29–58 || W1
|- style="background:#bbcaff;"
| – || July 11 ||colspan="8" |2017 Major League Baseball All-Star Game at Marlins Park in Miami
|- style="background:#fbb"
| 88 || July 14 || @ Brewers || 6–9 || Zach Davies (11–4) || Nick Pivetta (2–5) || Corey Knebel (15) || 41,941 || 29–59 || L1
|- style="background:#fbb"
| 89 || July 15 || @ Brewers || 2–3 || Jacob Barnes (2–1) || Joaquín Benoit (1–4) || Corey Knebel (16) || 37,950 || 29–60 || L2
|- style="background:#bfb"
| 90 || July 16 || @ Brewers || 5–2 ||  || Rob Scahill (1–3) || Héctor Neris (8) || 41,747 || 30–60 || W1
|- style="background:#fbb"
| 91 || July 17 || @ Marlins || 5–6 (10) || Drew Steckenrider (1–1) || Mark Leiter (1–2) || — || 17,146 || 30–61 || L1
|- style="background:#bfb"
| 92 || July 18 || @ Marlins || 5–2 || Pat Neshek (3–2) || Dustin McGowan (5–1) || Héctor Neris (9) || 18,176 || 31–61 || W1
|- style="background:#bfb"
| 93 || July 19 || @ Marlins || 10–3 || Nick Pivetta (3–5) || Dan Straily (7–5) || — || 31,854 || 32–61 || W2
|- style="background:#bfb"
| 94 || July 21 || Brewers || 6–1 || Aaron Nola (7–6) || Matt Garza (4–5) || — || 17,550 || 33–61 || W3
|- style="background:#fbb"
| 95 || July 22 || Brewers || 8–9 || Jacob Barnes (3–1) || Héctor Neris (2–4) || Corey Knebel (17) || 17,712 || 33–62 || L1
|- style="background:#bfb"
| 96 || July 23 || Brewers || 6–3 || Jerad Eickhoff (2–7) || Junior Guerra (1–4) || Luis García (1) || 21,258 || 34–62 || W1
|- style="background:#fbb"
| 97 || July 24 || Astros || 4–13 || Joe Musgrove (5–8) || Vince Velasquez (2–6) || — || 17,567 || 34–63 || L1
|- style="background:#fbb"
| 98 || July 25 || Astros || 0–5 || Charlie Morton (8–4) || Nick Pivetta (3–6) || — || 17,176 || 34–64 || L2
|- style="background:#bfb"
| 99 || July 26 || Astros || 9–0 || Aaron Nola (8–6) || Mike Fiers (7–5) || — || 19,718 || 35–64 || W1
|- style="background:#bfb"
| 100 || July 28 || Braves || 10–3 || Jake Thompson (1–0) || Julio Teherán (7–9) || Joaquín Benoit (2) || 17,177 || 36–64 || W2
|- style="background:#bfb"
| 101 || July 29 || Braves || 4–3 (11) || Héctor Neris (3–4) || Rex Brothers (1–1) || — || 28,162 || 37–64 || W3
|- style="background:#bfb"
| 102 || July 30 || Braves || 2–1 || Héctor Neris (4–4) || Rex Brothers (1–2) || — || 20,680 || 38–64 || W4
|- style="background:#bfb"
| 103 || July 31 || Braves || 7–6 || Nick Pivetta (4–6) || Mike Foltynewicz (9–6) || Héctor Neris (10) || 20,297 || 39–64 || W5
|-

|- style="background:#fbb"
| 104 || August 1 || @ Angels || 1–7 || Ricky Nolasco (5–12) || Aaron Nola (8–7) || — || 36,344 || 39–65 || L1
|- style="background:#fbb"
| 105 || August 2 || @ Angels || 0–7 || J. C. Ramírez (10–9) || Jake Thompson (1–1) || — || 34,623 || 39–66 || L2
|- style="background:#fbb"
| 106 || August 3 || @ Angels || 4–5 || Yusmeiro Petit (3–0) || Luis García (1–2) || Bud Norris (17) || 34,710 || 39–67 || L3
|- style="background:#fbb"
| 107 || August 4 || @ Rockies || 3–4 || Mike Dunn (4–1) || Luis García (1–3) || Greg Holland (34) || 35,092 || 39–68 || L4
|- style="background:#fbb"
| 108 || August 5 || @ Rockies || 5–8 || Jon Gray (4–2) || Nick Pivetta (4–7) || — || 40,563 || 39–69 || L5
|- style="background:#bfb"
| 109 || August 6 || @ Rockies || 3–2 || Edubray Ramos (1–7) || Greg Holland (2–2) || Héctor Neris (11) || 48,069 || 40–69 || W1
|- style="background:#bfb"
| 110 || August 8 || @ Braves || 5–2 || Zach Eflin (1–3) || Julio Teherán (7–10) || Héctor Neris (12) || 25,783 || 41–69 || W2
|- style="background:#bfb"
| 111 || August 9 || @ Braves || 3–2 || Jerad Eickhoff (3–7) || Sean Newcomb (1–7) || Héctor Neris (13) || 22,776 || 42–69 || W3
|- style="background:#fbb"
| 112 || August 10 || Mets || 0–10 || Jacob deGrom (13–5) || Vince Velasquez (2–7) || — || 27,716 || 42–70 || L1
|- style="background:#fbb"
| 113 || August 11 || Mets || 6–7 || Hansel Robles (7–3) || Héctor Neris (4–5) || A. J. Ramos (22) || 26,925 || 42–71 || L2
|- style="background:#bfb"
| 114 || August 12 || Mets || 3–1 || Aaron Nola (9–7) || Steven Matz (2–6) || Luis García (2) || 34,131 || 43–71 || W1
|- style="background:#fbb"
| 115 || August 13 || Mets || 2–6 || Chris Flexen (2–1) || Zach Eflin (1–4) || — || 24,106 || 43–72 || L1
|- style="background:#fbb"
| 116 || August 14 || @ Padres || 4–7 || José Torres (7–3) || Ricardo Pinto (1–1) || Brad Hand (10) || 20,873 || 43–73 || L2
|- style="background:#fbb"
| 117 || August 15 || @ Padres || 4–8 || Dinelson Lamet (7–4) || Mark Leiter (1–3) || — || 23,368 || 43–74 || L3
|- style="background:#fbb"
| 118 || August 16 || @ Padres || 0–3 || Clayton Richard (6–12) || Nick Pivetta (4–8) || — || 21,564 || 43–75 || L4
|- style="background:#fbb"
| 119 || August 17 || @ Giants || 4–5 || Jeff Samardzija (8–12) || Aaron Nola (9–8) || Sam Dyson (20) || 41,279 || 43–76 || L5
|- style="background:#fbb"
| 120 || August 18 || @ Giants || 2–10 || Matt Moore (4–12) || Zach Eflin (1–5) || — || 39,487 || 43–77 || L6
|- style="background:#bfb"
| 121 || August 19 || @ Giants || 12–9 || Adam Morgan (1–1) || Ty Blach (8–9) || Héctor Neris (14) || 40,719 || 44–77 || W1
|- style="background:#bfb"
| 122 || August 20 || @ Giants || 5–2 || Adam Morgan (2–1) || Hunter Strickland (2–3) || Héctor Neris (15) || 39,921 || 45–77 || W2
|- style="background:#fbb"
| 123 ||  || Marlins || 8–12 || Dan Straily (8–8) || Aaron Nola (9–9) || — || see 2nd game || 45–78 || L1
|- style="background:#fbb"
| 124 || August 22 (2) || Marlins || 4–7 || José Ureña (12–5) || Nick Pivetta (4–9) || Brad Ziegler (7) || 20,761 || 45–79 ||
|- style="background:#bfb"
| 125 || August 23 || Marlins || 8–0 || Mark Leiter (2–3) || Justin Nicolino (2–2) || — || 19,161 || 46–79 || W1
|- style="background:#fbb"
| 126 || August 24 || Marlins || 8–9 || Jarlin García (1–2) || Luis García (1–4) || Brad Ziegler (8) || 18,083 || 46–80 || L1
|- style="background:#bfb"
| 127 || August 25 || Cubs || 7–1 || Jerad Eickhoff (4–7) || José Quintana (8–11) || — || 24,424 || 47–80 || W1
|- style="background:#fbb"
| 128 || August 26 || Cubs || 2–17 || Kyle Hendricks (5–4) || Ben Lively (1–5) || — || 29,379 || 47–81 || L1
|- style="background:#bfb"
| 129 || August 27 || Cubs || 6–3 || Nick Pivetta (5–9) || John Lackey (10–10) || Héctor Neris (16) || 28,689 || 48–81 || W1
|- style="background:#bfb"
| 130 || August 28 || Braves || 6–1 || Aaron Nola' (10–9) || Lucas Sims (2–4) || — || 15,154 || 49–81 || W2
|- style="background:#bbb"
| – || August 29 || Braves || colspan=7 | Postponed (rain); Makeup: August 30 as a straight doubleheader
|- style="background:#fbb"
| 131 || August 30 (1) || Braves || 1–9 || R. A. Dickey (9–8) || Jerad Eickhoff (4–8) || — || see 2nd game || 49–82 || L1
|- style="background:#fbb"
| 132 || August 30 (2) || Braves || 2–5 || Julio Teherán (9–11) || Mark Leiter (2–4) || Arodys Vizcaíno (9) || 15,706 || 49–83 || L3
|- style="background:#bfb"
| 133 || August 31 || @ Marlins || 3–2 || Ben Lively (2–5) ||  || Héctor Neris (17) || 17,013 || 50–83 || W1
|-

|- style="background:#bfb"
| 134 || September 1 || @ Marlins || 2–1 || Juan Nicasio (3–5) || Brad Ziegler (1–3) || Héctor Neris (18) || 17,998 || 51–83 || W1
|- style="background:#fbb"
| 135 || September 2 || @ Marlins || 9–10 || Dan Straily (9–8) || Aaron Nola (10–10) || Drew Steckenrider (1) || 18,262 || 51–84 || L1
|- style="background:#bfb"
| 136 || September 3 || @ Marlins || 3–1 (12) || Adam Morgan (3–1) || Junichi Tazawa (3–4) || Héctor Neris (19) || 19,404 || 52–84 || W1
|- style="background:#fbb"
| 137 || September 4 || @ Mets || 7–11 || Rafael Montero (4–9) || Mark Leiter (2–5) || — || 28,808 || 52–85 || L1
|- style="background:#bfb"
| 138 || September 5 || @ Mets || 9–1 || Ben Lively (3–5) || Jacob deGrom (14–9) || — || 22,230 || 53–85 || W1
|- style="background:#fbb"
| 139 || September 6 || @ Mets || 3–6 (6) || Robert Gsellman (6–6) || Nick Pivetta (5–10) || — || 19,617 || 53–86 || L1
|- style="background:#fbb"
| 140 || September 7 || @ Nationals || 3–4 || Tanner Roark (12–9) || Adam Morgan (3–2) || Sean Doolittle (19) || 26,267 || 53–87 || L2
|- style="background:#fbb"
| 141 || September 8 || @ Nationals || 10–11 || Max Scherzer (14–5) || Jake Thompson (1–2) || Sean Doolittle (20) || 29,837 || 53–88 || L3
|- style="background:#bfb"
| 142 || September 9 || @ Nationals || 5–4 || Mark Leiter (3–5) || Edwin Jackson (5–5) || Héctor Neris (20) || 35,694 || 54–88 || W1
|- style="background:#fbb"
| 143 ||  || @ Nationals || 2–3 ||  || Ben Lively (3–6) || Ryan Madson (2) || 32,627 || 54–89 || L1
|- style="background:#bfb"
| 144 || September 12 || Marlins || 9–8 (15) || Edubray Ramos (2–7) || Javy Guerra (1–1) || — || 16,439 || 55–89 || W1
|- style="background:#bfb"
| 145 || September 13 || Marlins || 8–1 || Aaron Nola (11–10) || Dan Straily (9–9) || — || 16,745 || 56–89 || W2
|- style="background:#bfb"
| 146 || September 14 || Marlins || 10–0 || Jake Thompson (2–2) || Vance Worley (2–6) || — || 16,302 || 57–89 || W3
|- style="background:#fbb"
| 147 || September 15 || Athletics || 0–4 || Daniel Mengden (1–1) || Mark Leiter (3–6) || — || 24,061 || 57–90 || L1
|- style="background:#bfb"
| 148 || September 16 || Athletics || 5–3 || Víctor Arano (1–0) || Simón Castro (1–3) || Héctor Neris (21) || 24,290 || 58–90 || W1
|- style="background:#fbb"
| 149 || September 17 || Athletics || 3–6 || Sean Manaea (11–10) ||  || Blake Treinen (11) || 28,054 || 58–91 || L1
|- style="background:#bfb"
| 150 || September 18 || Dodgers || 4–3 || Nick Pivetta (6–10) || Clayton Kershaw (17–4) || Héctor Neris (22) || 16,690 || 59–91 || W1
|- style="background:#bfb"
| 151 || September 19 || Dodgers || 6–2 || Aaron Nola (12–10) || Pedro Báez (3–6) || — || 20,145 || 60–91 || W2
|- style="background:#bfb"
| 152 || September 20 || Dodgers || 7–5 || Luis García (2–4) || Luis Avilán (2–3) || Héctor Neris (23) || 20,175 || 61–91 || W3
|- style="background:#fbb"
| 153 || September 21 || Dodgers || 4–5 || Walker Buehler (1–0) || Ricardo Pinto (1–2) || Kenley Jansen (39) || 18,735 || 61–92 || L1
|- style="background:#fbb"
| 154 || September 22 || @ Braves || 2–7 || Sean Newcomb (4–8) || Ben Lively (3–7) || — || 33,702 || 61–93 || L2
|- style="background:#fbb"
| 155 || September 23 || @ Braves || 2–4 || Rex Brothers (4–3) || Luis García (2–5) || Arodys Vizcaíno (13) || 39,809 || 61–94 || L3
|- style="background:#bfb"
| 156 || September 24 || @ Braves || 2–0 || Nick Pivetta (7–10) || Luiz Gohara (1–3) || Héctor Neris (24) || 33,183 || 62–94 || W1
|- style="background:#fbb"
| 157 || September 25 || Nationals || 1–3 || A. J. Cole (3–5) || Aaron Nola (12–11) || Sean Doolittle (24) || 17,026 || 62–95 || L1
|- style="background:#bfb"
| 158 || September 26 || Nationals || 4–1 || Jake Thompson (3–2) || Gio González (15–8) || Héctor Neris (25) || 16,437 || 63–95 || W1
|- style="background:#bfb"
| 159 || September 27 || Nationals || 7–5 || Yacksel Ríos (1–0) || Tanner Roark (13–11) || Héctor Neris (26) || 17,642 || 64–95 || W2
|- style="background:#bfb"
| 160 || September 29 || Mets || 6–2 || Ben Lively (4–7) || Matt Harvey (5–7) || — || 19,375 || 65–95 || W3
|- style="background:#fbb"
| 161 || September 30 || Mets || 4–7 (11) || Jacob Rhame (1–1) || Adam Morgan (3–3) || Jeurys Familia (6) || 25,138 || 65–96 || L1
|- style="background:#bfb"
| 162 || October 1 || Mets || 11–0 || Nick Pivetta (8–10) || Chris Flexen (3–6) || — || 25,754 || 66–96 || W1
|-

Roster
All players who made an appearance for the Phillies during 2017 are included.

Farm system

External links

 2017 Philadelphia Phillies season at Baseball Reference
 Philadelphia Phillies' official website

References

Philadelphia Phillies seasons
Philadelphia Phillies
Philadelphia Phillies